The city of Montreal is divided into 19 boroughs (in French, arrondissements), each with a mayor and council.

Powers 

The borough council is responsible for:
Fire prevention
Removal of household waste and residual materials
Funding of community
Social and local economic development agencies
Planning and management of parks and recreational facilities
Cultural and sports facilities, organization of recreational sports and sociocultural activities
Maintaining local roads
Issuing permits
Public consultations for amendments to city planning bylaws
Public consultations and dissemination of information to the public
Land use planning and borough development.

List of Montreal boroughs

List of former boroughs

Map

See also
 Districts of Montreal
 History of Montreal
 Montreal Merger
 Municipal reorganization in Quebec

References

External links

Official portal of Montréal